David Kirkland (1878–1964) was an American actor and film director of the silent and early sound eras.

He was cast as Dr. Dopem in the Snakeville comedy series and directed several Keystone Studios comedy films. He was a pallbearer at Virginia Rappe's funeral. Kirkland's 1920 film The Perfect Woman was preserved by the Academy Film Archive in 2017.

Partial filmography

 The Crippled Hand (1916)
 A Temperamental Wife (1919)
 A Virtuous Vamp (1919)
 In Search of a Sinner (1920)
 The Love Expert (1920)
 Nothing But the Truth (1920)
 The Perfect Woman (1920)
 The Rowdy (1921)
 The Ladder Jinx (1922)
 The Veiled Woman (1922)
 The Barefoot Boy (1923)
 For Another Woman (1924)
 The Tomboy (1924)
 Who Cares (1925)
 All Around Frying Pan (1925)
 The Tough Guy (1926)
 The Two-Gun Man (1926)
 A Regular Scout (1926)
 Hands Across the Border (1926)
 The Gingham Girl (1927)
 Yours to Command (1927)
 Uneasy Payments (1927)
 The Candy Kid (1928)
 Riders of the Cactus (1931)
 Flying Lariats (1931)
 So This Is Arizona (1931)

References

Bibliography
 Munden, Kenneth White. The American Film Institute Catalog of Motion Pictures Produced in the United States, Part 1. University of California Press, 1997.

External links

1878 births
1964 deaths
American male film actors
American film directors
People from San Francisco